Betim is a town in Minas Gerais, Brazil. The city belongs to the mesoregion Metropolitan of Belo Horizonte (BH) and to the microregion of Belo Horizonte. It is the fifth largest city in Minas Gerais and one of the 50 largest cities in the Southeast of Brazil.

Betim is home to a Petrobras's oil refineries, as well as Fiat's largest factory, which opened in 1976. The city has an important role not only in the state's economy, but in the whole country's as well.

Notable people
Jonathas de Jesus, professional footballer.

See also
 List of municipalities in Minas Gerais
 Ramacrisna

References

Municipalities in Minas Gerais